WKYW-LP (102.9 FM) is a radio station licensed to serve the community of Keyser, West Virginia. The station is owned by Mineral County Travel, Tourism, Convention and Visitors Bureau, Ltd. It airs a variety radio format. The station's studios are located on the campus of Potomac State College of West Virginia University.

The station was assigned the WKYW-LP call letters by the Federal Communications Commission on May 22, 2014.

References

External links
 Official Website
 

KYW-LP
KYW-LP
Radio stations established in 2017
2017 establishments in West Virginia
Variety radio stations in the United States
Mineral County, West Virginia
Potomac State College of West Virginia University